Kinef, an abbreviation for Kirishi Petroleum Organic Synthesis, is a Russian joint stock production association operating a large oil refinery based in Kirishi, Leningrad Oblast. It is a subsidiary of Surgutneftegaz. The Kirishi refinery is the only one in Northwestern Russia.

History
Construction of the refinery had begun in 1961 in an area devastated by World War II. The first oil products were produced in 1966. By 1972, the Kirishi refinery had been one of the five largest in the Soviet Union.

In 1980 the plant was reconstructed and started diesel hydrotreating unit with capacity of two million tonnes per year. The main fractionation tower K-5 weighing 335.2 tons, diameter of 5 m and a length of 62 m was delivered by "Spetstyazhavtotrans" from the factory "Dzerzhinskhimmash".

In 1987 Kirishineftekhimexport subdivision of Kirishinefteorgsintez was founded to conduct external economic activity of the company. In 1991 it became an independent state-owned enterprise, but continued trading for Kirishinefteorgsintez.

In 1993, the refinery became a part of the Surgutneftegaz JSC.

In December 1994, the refinery opened a plant for the production of roofing and waterproofing, sound-proof roll material, as well as bitumen-polymer mastic hot applications.  In 1996, a complex for the production of linear alkyl benzene was opened.  In 1999, a technical re-gas fractionation plant was opened.

External links

Official site (in Russian)

Oil companies of Russia
Oil refineries in Russia
Oil companies of the Soviet Union
Companies based in Leningrad Oblast
Oil refineries in the Soviet Union